Lee Jenny (the romanization preferred by the author according to LTI Korea) (born 1972) is a South Korean poet. She was born in Busan. She began her literary career by publishing Peru in 2008 through the Kyunghyang Daily News New Writer's Award. She has published two poetry collections, and has won the Pyeon-un Literature Award in 2011 as well as the Kim Hyeon Prize in 2016. Jo Jaeryong, a literary critic, has praised her as a ‘master of rhythm that is bringing us to the frontlines of poetry’.

Life 
Lee Jenny dreamed of becoming a writer since the 4th grade. She was admitted to Kyungnam University, and since she was 22 she submitted her works to new writers contests for fiction, but was constantly rejected. She would find a job when she ran out of money, and once she had enough saved, she would quit and focus on writing. This continued until in 2008, she won the Kyunghyang Daily News New Writer's Award for her collection of poetry. After her debut, she received the attention of the literary community for her unique style of writing. She has not published a novel yet, but Lee Jenny is still currently writing a novel along with poetry, and has expressed that she would like to publish a novel when the opportunity arises.  In 2010 she published Amado Africa (아마도 아프리카 Maybe Africa), and in 2014 she published Waenyahamyeon urineun urireul moreugo (왜냐하면 우리는 우리를 모르고 Because we don't know ourselves). She was awarded the Pyeon-un Literature Award in 2011, and won the Kimhyeon Munhakpae in 2016. She is a member of the experimental text collective ‘Ru’.

Writing 
Lee Jenny's poetry contains a lot of repetition, as if she is incanting a spell. Repetition is used in poetry often as a device to amplify emotional effects. In Lee Jenny's poetry, repetition of phrases strengthens lyrical rhythm. However, in a traditional sense, it is difficult to state that her works are lyrical poetry. This is because she is also very skilled at simulating the reader's thoughts by precisely organizing conceptual language.

Early on, literary critics expressed the Lee Jenny's poetry do ‘wordplay’ by laying out similar words. However, for her repetition is only a device that is used to freely imagine. Repeating a word is an evidence that shows the poet's critical mind that attempts to stay between language and the object being described without directly being in contact with the object. By having such careful and cautious attitude, Lee Jenny carries out a deep thinking process on the true nature of an object.

Also, by focusing on “the words of an orphan trapped in a forest of circles”, Lee Jenny restores “the world of things that wander”. Her poetry often features children that enjoy playing with meaningless symbols. When considering their existence, it can be said that the phrases that are repeated towards meaninglessness in Lee Jenny's poetry reflect the poet's own efforts of attempting to approach the unconscious. With such methods, Lee Jenny describes how the language of the lonely spirals out, and brings such image to the literary stage. In Korea, not only is Lee Jenny acknowledged for her ability to make unique rhythms through repetition, but is also praised as a skilled poet who can “make poems by deferring meaning itself.”

Works 
 Amado Africa (아마도 아프리카 Maybe Africa), Changbi, 2010.  
 Waenyahamyeon urineun urireul moreugo (왜냐하면 우리는 우리를 모르고 Because we don't know ourselves), Moonji Publishing, 2014.

Awards 
 2011 Pyeon-un Literature Award
 2016 Kim Hyeon Prize

Further reading 
 Lee Chan,  “After the ‘Future Party’ and the ‘Political Poetry’, the Aporia of the Poetry of Our Time”,  Literature and Practice, 2011.  
 Jang Eunseok, “The Arabesque Made By Liquefied Emotions”, Sijak, 2011.

References 

1972 births
Living people
South Korean women poets
21st-century South Korean poets
21st-century South Korean women writers